NGC 4578 is a lenticular galaxy located about 55 million light-years away in the constellation Virgo. NGC 4578 was discovered by astronomer William Herschel on January 18, 1784 and is a member of the Virgo Cluster.

See also
 List of NGC objects (4001–5000)
 NGC 4365

References

External links
 

Virgo (constellation)
Lenticular galaxies
4578
42149
7793
Astronomical objects discovered in 1784
Virgo Cluster
Discoveries by William Herschel